Ciungi River may refer to:

 A tributary of the Trotuș in eastern Romania
 A tributary of the Gologan in Galați County, Romania

See also 
 Ciunga River, in Romania and Hungary